Pista de Atletismo Darwin Piñeirúa is an athletic stadium in Montevideo, Uruguay. It is situated in the Parque Batlle near Estadio Centenario.

References

Athletics (track and field) venues in Uruguay
Sports venues in Montevideo